Gianluca Savoldi (born 20 September 1975 in Bologna, Italy), is a retired Italian footballer who played as a striker.

Career
The son of once World record transferred player Giuseppe Savoldi, the young Gianluca decided to walk in his father's footsteps. Albeit a decent striker on semi-professional level, Savoldi could not step ut to the plate when joining Ascoli in the late 1990s, but played good enough at Cosenza to be discovered by nearby Reggina, the club looking for a striker, having been relegated to Serie B and lost Massimo Marazzina.

Savoldi's first season with Reggina was the most successful of his career, the 25-year-old propelling Reggina to Serie A with 15 goals. His partnership with Davide Dionigi played its part in the success, as Reggina was among the highest-scoring teams in the league. Savoldi did only play one season in Serie A, however, with his performance at the highest level not considered as good enough by Reggina's management, prompting a sale to Serie B club Napoli, where he rejoined Dionigi. Napoli was the club that paid the World record-fee for his father, and therefore the expectations were high on Savoldi, who once again failed to deliver. Napoli was closer to relegation than promotion, and Savoldi was sold to Crotone, which was the beginning of the end of his career in the big time.

Savoldi spent the following six seasons in smaller clubs, some professional, others in a semi-professional mode. He also moved north of the border to try his wings in second division Swiss football, but his time with Chiasso was not a successful one.

Sources
  Gianluca Savoldi - Tuttocalciatori.net (Italian)

1975 births
Italian footballers
Association football forwards
Serie A players
Serie B players
Italian expatriate footballers
Ascoli Calcio 1898 F.C. players
U.S. Avellino 1912 players
FC Chiasso players
Cosenza Calcio 1914 players
F.C. Crotone players
Calcio Lecco 1912 players
A.C. Monza players
S.S.C. Napoli players
Pisa S.C. players
Reggina 1914 players
S.S.D. Varese Calcio players
Venezia F.C. players
A.S.D. Olimpia Colligiana players
Expatriate footballers in Switzerland
Italian expatriate sportspeople in Switzerland
Living people